Masajiro Kaihatsu, known professionally as Yukio Aoyama, was an actor and assistant director in the United States during the silent film era. He appeared in about 60 silent films and serials after immigrating from Tokyo to appear in films. His son Arthur Aoyama (Arthur Kaihatsu) was a child actor.  Aoyama  was one of several Japanese actors in Hollywood and he was involved with a theater production of the Japanese tragedy, Matsuo.

Filmography
Pidgin Island (1916)
The Bravest Way (1918)
A Japanese Nightingale (1918)
Thieves (1919)
Who's Your Servant? (1920)
The Tiger Band (1920), a serial

References

External links
IMDb entry

Year of birth missing
Japanese male film actors
Japanese male silent film actors
Japanese emigrants to the United States
20th-century Japanese male actors